These are lists of the major tenants of the former World Trade Center in New York City at the time of the attacks in 2001.

 1 World Trade Center (North Tower) included the Port Authority of New York and New Jersey, Marsh & McLennan Companies, Bank of America, Cantor Fitzgerald, Dai-Ichi Kangyo Group, Sidley Austin Brown & Wood, and restaurant Windows on the World. 
 2 World Trade Center (South Tower) included Verizon, the New York Stock Exchange, Morgan Stanley, Xerox Corporation, Keefe, Bruyette & Woods, Aon Corporation, and Fiduciary Trust Company International.
 3 World Trade Center (also known as the Marriott World Trade Center) was a hotel, therefore the whole building had one owner, Host Marriott Corporation.
 4 World Trade Center included New York Board of Trade, Deutsche Bank, and the Mall at the World Trade Center.
 5 World Trade Center included Credit Suisse First Boston and Morgan Stanley.
 6 World Trade Center included the United States Department of Commerce, Bureau of Alcohol, Tobacco, Firearms and Explosives, and the United States Department of Labor.
 7 World Trade Center included Salomon Smith Barney, the U.S. Securities and Exchange Commission, Standard Chartered Bank, and the U.S. Secret Service.

 
Lists of companies based in New York (state)